Yes! (Young Engineers Sportscar) is a brand of high-performance sports cars manufactured by YES! Beteiligungs- und Besitzgesellschaft mbH in Germany. 

YES! was founded in January 1999. The manager and founder is Marco Kunz; he was the first YES! turbo client in Germany. The headquarters is in Edermünde, Germany. 
 
The original car was a mid-engined, rear-wheel-drive model powered by a 1.8-litre four-cylinder Volkswagen turbo engine.

Drive to the rear wheels is through a six-speed gearbox.

Cars of Germany
Roadsters
Rear-wheel-drive vehicles